Bagh Madi (also Romanized as Bāgh Mādī; also known as Bāgh-e ‘Emādī) is a village in Karchambu-e Jonubi Rural District, in the Central District of Buin va Miandasht County, Isfahan Province, Iran. At the 2006 census, its population was 100, in 25 families.

References 

Populated places in Buin va Miandasht County